Princeton Township is one of twenty-five townships in Bureau County, Illinois, USA. As of the 2020 census, its population was 9,223 and it contained 4,465 housing units.

Geography

Cities
 Princeton (partial)

Cemeteries
The township contains four cemeteries:
 Elm Lawn
 Jenkins-Green
 Oakland
 Woodlawn-Stoner

Major highways
  Interstate 80
  US Route 6
  US Route 34
  Illinois Route 26

Airports and landing strips
 Perry Memorial Hospital Heliport

Landmarks
 Princeton Park

Demographics
As of the 2020 census there were 9,223 people, 4,004 households, and 2,483 families residing in the township. The racial makeup of the township was 92.16% White, 0.96% African American, 0.33% Native American, 1.30% Asian, 0.14% Pacific Islander, 1.04% from other races, and 4.07% from two or more races. Hispanic or Latino of any race were 4.25% of the population.

There were 4,004 households, out of which 26.30% had children under the age of 18 living with them, 47.40% were married couples living together, 11.61% had a female householder with no spouse present, and 37.99% were non-families. 32.80% of all households were made up of individuals, and 18.60% had someone living alone who was 65 years of age or older. The average household size was 2.16 and the average family size was 2.69.

The township's age distribution consisted of 19.3% under the age of 18, 6.6% from 18 to 24, 19.6% from 25 to 44, 25.4% from 45 to 64, and 29.1% who were 65 years of age or older. The median age was 48.6 years. For every 100 females, there were 79.8 males. For every 100 females age 18 and over, there were 79.8 males.

The median income for a household in the township was $52,990, and the median income for a family was $69,510. Males had a median income of $46,371 versus $23,102 for females. The per capita income for the township was $32,761. About 7.9% of families and 12.9% of the population were below the poverty line, including 23.3% of those under age 18 and 6.8% of those age 65 or over.

School districts
 Bureau Valley Community Unit School District 340
 Princeton Elementary School District 115
 Princeton High School District 500

Political districts
 Illinois's 11th congressional district
 State House District 74
 State Senate District 37

References
 
 US Census Bureau 2007 TIGER/Line Shapefiles
 US National Atlas

External links
 City-Data.com
 Illinois State Archives

Townships in Bureau County, Illinois
Populated places established in 1849
Townships in Illinois
1849 establishments in Illinois